Coleanor, also known as Coal-Eleanor, is an unincorporated community in Bibb County, Alabama, United States.

History
The mine at Coleanor was originally known as the Upper Thompson Mine. The Blocton-Cahaba Coal Company operated a coal mine at Coleanor. Combined with nearby Piper, the two towns had a combined population of nearly 2,500. Coleanor was connected by rail to Piper and was located on the Southern Railway. The Coleanor Mine was closed after World War II.

In February 1934, members of the United Mine Workers called a strike at the Coleanor mine. Alabama National Guard troops were called in to Coleanor on February 25 to restore order.

Twelve different miners died working in the mines of Coleanor.

A post office operated under the name Coleanor from 1901 to 1942.

References

Unincorporated communities in Bibb County, Alabama
Unincorporated communities in Alabama